The 2021–22 Atlantic 10 Conference men's basketball season started non-conference play on November 9, 2021 and began conference play on December 30, 2021. The regular season ended on March 5, 2022, followed by the 2022 Atlantic 10 men's basketball tournament from March 9 to March 13.

Conference Schedule
Each team is scheduled to play 18 conference games. This results in each team playing 8 teams a singular time and 5 teams twice, once at home and once on the road.

Head Coaches

Coach Changes
Fordham hired Kyle Neptune after Jeff Neubauer was fired during the previous midseason after a 1–7 start.

George Mason hired Kim English after Dave Paulsen was fired after going 13–9.

Coaches

Notes:

 Year at school includes 2021–22 season.
 Overall and Atlantic 10 records are from the time at current school and are through the end of the 2020–21 season.
 NCAA Tournament appearances are from the time at current school only.

Preseason Awards

Preseason men's basketball poll
First Place Votes in Parenthesis

 St. Bonaventure (28) - 392
 Richmond - 359
 Saint Louis - 325
 VCU - 288
 Dayton - 274
 Davidson - 260
 Rhode Island - 231
 George Mason - 158
 UMass - 147
 Saint Joseph's - 144
 Duquesne - 129
 La Salle - 105
 George Washington - 96
 Fordham - 32

Preseason Honors

Regular season

Rankings

Notes:

 No Coaches Poll Week 2
 Top Box is the AP Poll
 Bottom Box is the Coaches Poll

Conference standings

Conference Matrix

Players of the Week

Records against other conferences

Postseason
The Atlantic 10 Men's Basketball tournament was held in Washington, D.C. at Capital One Arena from March 9th to March 13th

References